Photios Kalpidis (1862–1906) or Photios of Korytsa was the Greek Orthodox metropolitan bishop of Korçë, Ottoman Empire, from 1902 to 1906. He was assassinated in 1906 by irregular bands due to his pro-Greek activity. Photios was proclaimed an "ethnomartyr" by the Church of Greece.

Life
Photios was born in 1862 in the village of Cakrak, in Pontus region, Ottoman Empire. After finishing school he moved to Constantinople and attended the Halki seminary. He graduated in 1889 with honors. The following year he was ordained hierodeacon, while he also became director of the Greek school of Giresun. In 1897 Photios was appointed secretary of the Holy Synod of the Ecumenical Patriarchate.

In 1902 Photios was appointed metropolitan bishop of Korytsa and Premeti, centered in Korçe, modern southeast Albania (then part of the Ottoman Empire). In general, Photios showed great interest in the promotion of the thriving Greek educational system among the local youth and often made various proposals. He also became the president of the city's schools committee. In 1903 he was actively involved in all major educational issues that concerned the schools in Korce, as well as in nearby Permet. During the 1903–1904 school year he proposed that sports activities should be part of the curriculum in the local schools. As a result, the first sports events by the pupils of Korce took place on May 30, 1904, in the local Bangas Gymnasium. In the following school year these events attracted a major part of the local population and officials who attended them.

On June 7, 1904, Photios took the initiative for the creation of the Appollo music association and the charitable society Love thy Neighbour as part of his educational, cultural and social initiatives in Korce. Moreover, Appollo for a short term period was also undertaking concerts and theatrical performances.

Assassination
Photios was assassinated on September 9, 1906 by a band of Albanian kachak nationalists, led by Bajo Topulli. The assassination was committed because Photios was against the development of Albanian cultural activity, as well as an act of revenge for the killing of the Albanian priest Kristo Negovani in 1905. Although the arrests included many Albanian nationalists of the time, they were subsequently released by the Ottoman authorities. In 1914, after the Balkan Wars, the Greek army arrested Bajram Ligu, but he denied any involvement with the murder.

Kalpidis was proclaimed a national martyr ("ethnomartyr") by the Church of Greece. A number of streets are named after him as Fotiou Koritsas (Φωτίου Κορυτσάς) in suburbs around the port city of Piraeus, within the Athens urban area.

Notes

References

Sources
 (PhD Thesis)

1862 births
1906 deaths
20th-century Greek people
20th-century Eastern Orthodox bishops
Eastern Orthodoxy in Albania
Bishops of the Ecumenical Patriarchate of Constantinople
Eastern Orthodox bishops in Europe
People from Alucra
Pontic Greeks
Greek Eastern Orthodox priests
Theological School of Halki alumni
Greeks from the Ottoman Empire
1906 murders in the Ottoman Empire
Eastern Orthodox bishops in Albania